was a Japanese waka poet of the early Heian period. His exact dates of birth and death are unknown, but he was a fourth-generation descendant of Sakanoue no Tamuramaro.

He was one of the Thirty-six Immortals of Poetry and one of his poems was included in the Ogura Hyakunin Isshu. Forty-one of his poems were ultimately included in the imperial anthologies.

He was the father of the poet .

During his own life he was known primarily as a champion kemari player. On March 2, 905, he and his colleagues kicked a ball 206 times without interruption at the Imperial Court, and were praised by the emperor.

He served as governor of Kaga Province.

Poetry
One of his poems was included as No. 31 in Fujiwara no Teika's Ogura Hyakunin Isshu:

References

Bibliography

External links 
E-text of his poems in Japanese

9th century in Japan
9th-century Japanese poets
10th-century Japanese people
10th-century Japanese poets
Date of birth unknown
Date of death unknown
Hyakunin Isshu poets